= Jacobsen Holdings Ltd v Drexel =

- Court: Court of Appeal of New Zealand
- Full case name: Jacobsen Holdings Ltd v Drexel
- Decided: 15 August 1986
- Citation: [1986] NZCA 75; [1986] 1 NZLR 324
- Transcript: http://www.nzlii.org/cgi-bin/sinodisp/nz/cases/NZCA/1986/75.html

Court membership
- Judges sitting: Cooke, Somers, Casey

Jacobsen Holdings Ltd v Drexel [1986] NZCA 75; [1986] 1 NZLR 324 is a cited case in New Zealand regarding property law.
